This is a list of notable mosques in the United Kingdom listed by regions in Scotland, England and Wales.

England

London

North East

North West

South East

South West

East of England

East Midlands

West Midlands

Yorkshire and the Humber

Scotland

Wales

Group

See also
 :Category:Mosques in the United Kingdom
 Islam in the United Kingdom
 Islamic schools and branches
 List of mosques in Europe
 List of mosques in Germany

References

External links
Directories of British Mosques:
 

 
United King
Mosques